Chucuito District is one of the districts of the Puno Province in the Puno Region in Peru.

Ethnic groups 
The people in the district are mainly indigenous citizens of Aymara descent. Aymara is the language which the majority of the population (73.54%) learnt to speak in childhood, 23.71% of the residents started speaking using the Spanish language (2007 Peru Census).

Images

See also 
 Inka Tunuwiri
 Inka Uyu

References

External links 
  www.munichucuito.gob.pe Official district web site